Finley  is a town in the Riverina region of New South Wales, Australia.  It is the largest town in the Berrigan Shire local government area. At the 2016 census, Finley had a population of 2,519 people.

History
The first permanent residence in the town was built in 1878. The post office opened on 1 January 1881 but was known as Murray Hut until 1893.
Europeans first settled the area around Finley in the early 1840s, with wheat becoming the main crop.

The Finley Agricultural & Pastoral Association was formed in 1912 and held its first show on 17 September 1913. The same agricultural show is still held annually on the first Sunday in September (Father's Day).

Periods of severe drought, combined with the Great Depression of the early 1930s, forced many farmers to abandon their holdings.

In 1935, construction on the Mulwala Canal began in order to provide employment and bring water to the area’s rich farmland, with irrigation reaching the area in 1939, celebrated with a 'Back-To-Finley' event. This enabled the region to prosper with beef and dairy cattle, sheep, wheat, rice, barley, maize and canola.

Heritage listings 
Finley has a number of heritage-listed sites, including:
 Narrandera-Tocumwal railway: Finley Railway Precinct

Education
Finley has two primary schools, St Joseph's School, (Roman Catholic) and Finley Public School. Finley High School attracts students from a wide catchment including the towns of Berrigan, Tocumwal, Jerilderie and Blighty.

Finley is also home to a campus of Riverina TAFE.

Sport
Australian rules football, cricket and netball are all very popular in the town.  Sporting teams include the Finley Football Club, who compete in the Murray Football League. The town also offers soccer, touch rugby, basketball, tennis and a Pony Club.

The Finley Rodeo Committee holds an annual rodeo every January and Finley Apex Club hosts a tractor pull every February.

Finley has an 18-hole green grass golf course and two bowling green locations.

Notable residents
 Jack Hawkins - Former  Geelong Australian rules footballer
 Shane Crawford - Former Hawthorn Australian rules footballer and 1999 Brownlow Medallist, 2019 I’m A Celebrity... Get Me Out Of Here contestant
 Mark Whiley - Former GWS Giants & Carlton Blues Australian rules footballer 
 Tom Hawkins - Current Geelong Australian rules footballer
 Kram, Whitty and Janet - members of rock band Spiderbait
 Craig Giles - musician

References

External links

 Community website
 Berrigan Shire - Official Site
 Finley Railway Station
 Finley Show Society Inc.

Towns in Berrigan Shire
Towns in the Riverina
Towns in New South Wales
Newell Highway
Murrumbidgee Council